The Scarborough Civic Centre is a civic centre located in the Scarborough district of Toronto, Ontario, Canada. It was designed by architect Raymond Moriyama during the development of Scarborough City Centre and initially opened as the city hall of the former borough of Scarborough by then mayor Albert Campbell and Queen Elizabeth II in 1973. The building served as the municipal office and office for the Scarborough Board of Education. Following the amalgamation of Toronto, Scarborough lost its city status and the civic centre became a secondary hub for the City of Toronto government. It is also home to the Scarborough Community Council and offices of the Toronto District School Board.

The civic centre is adjacent to Albert Campbell Square. It is south of Scarborough Centre station and the Scarborough Town Centre shopping mall.

Structure and surroundings
The building is unique for the juxtaposition of two triangular shaped, multiple split level towers, which surround an open central area in the interior. Outside the Civic Centre on the north side is Albert Campbell Square, named after Albert Campbell, Scarborough's first mayor, with a waterfall and reflecting pool, used as a skating rink in winter.

Sculptures are found on the southwest side of the building. The Hand of God, dedicated to Albert Campbell, depicts a man held up by a hand and is mounted on a mast; it is located south across Borough Drive. Gord Smith (sculptor)'s Icarus portrays bronze folds assembled together to represent a pair of outstretched wings. Frank Faubert Forest, a wooded area south of the Civic Centre is named for Scarborough's last mayor, Frank Faubert. Inside the main hall is a rising series of polished metal unfolding tetrahedrons resembling birds rising toward the ceiling from the main-floor-level pond, designed by Toronto artist James Sutherland in 1972.

In 2015, the Toronto Public Library opened the Scarborough Civic Centre branch, its 100th library branch. The Toronto Public Library Scarborough Civic Centre branch was designed by Toronto-based architecture firm LGA Architectural Partners with Philip H. Carter as planning consultant.

See also
 East York Civic Centre
 Etobicoke Civic Centre
 York Civic Centre
 North York Civic Centre
 Metro Hall
 Toronto City Hall

Notes

External links

 Scarborough Civic Centre

Buildings and structures in Scarborough, Toronto
Event venues established in 1973
City and town halls in Ontario
Modernist architecture in Canada
Municipal buildings in Toronto
Raymond Moriyama buildings
Former seats of local government
1973 establishments in Ontario